{{Infobox song
| name       = Jive Talkin'
| cover      = Jive Talkin.jpg
| alt        =
| type       = single
| artist     = Bee Gees
| album      = Main Course
| B-side     = Wind of Change
| released   = May 1975
| recorded   = 30 January19 February 1975
| studio     = Criteria, Miami
| genre      = *Funk<ref>{{cite web|first= Joseph |last= Brennan |title= Gibb Songs : 1975 |url= http://www.columbia.edu/~brennan/beegees/75.html |access-date= 29 January 2014 |agency= Columbia University |quote= 'Jive Talkin now continues on from 'Nights on Broadway' as another funk song, but there is no falsetto.}}</ref>
disco
| length     = *3:44 (album version)
3:33 (single version)
| label      = RSO
| writer     = *Barry Gibb
Robin Gibb
Maurice Gibb
| producer   = Arif Mardin
| prev_title = Charade
| prev_year  = 1974
| next_title = Nights on Broadway
| next_year  = 1975
| misc       = 
}}
"Jive Talkin" is a song by the Bee Gees, released as a single in May 1975 by RSO Records. This was the lead single from the album Main Course (as well as a song on the 1977 Saturday Night Fever soundtrack) and hit number one on the Billboard Hot 100; it also reached the top-five on the UK Singles Chart in the middle of 1975. Largely recognised as the group's "comeback" song, it was their first US top-10 hit since "How Can You Mend a Broken Heart" (1971).

Barry Gibb re-recorded the song as a duet with country music star Miranda Lambert for his 2021 album Greenfields.

Origins and recording
The song was originally called "Drive Talking" in its early stage. The song's rhythm was modelled after the sound their car made crossing the Julia Tuttle Causeway each day from Biscayne Bay to Criteria Studios in Miami.

Recording for "Jive Talkin took place on 30 January and 2 February 1975. The scratchy guitar intro was done by Barry and the funky bass line by Maurice. The pulsing synthesiser bass line, which featured in the final recording, was (along with the pioneering work of Stevie Wonder) one of the earliest uses of "synth bass" on a pop recording.  It was overdubbed by keyboardist Blue Weaver using a then state-of-the-art ARP 2600, which producer Arif Mardin had brought in for the recording of the Main Course album. Weaver stated, "Usually Maurice would play bass guitar, but he was away from the studio that night. And when Maurice came back, we let him hear it and suggested he re-record the bass line on his bass guitar". "I really liked the synth bass lines", Maurice said. "I overdubbed certain sections to add bass extra emphasis".

"Jive Talkin was also influenced by "You're the One" (written by Sly Stone) by Little Sister.

According to Maurice, while hearing this rhythmic sound, "Barry didn't notice that he's going 'Ji-Ji Jive Talkin'', thinking of the dance, 'You dance with your eyes'...that's all he had...exactly 35 mph...that's what we got." He goes on to say, "We played it to [producer] Arif [Mardin], and he went 'Do you know what "Jive Talkin means?' And we said 'Well yeah, it's, ya know, you're dancing.' [...] And he says 'No, it's a black expression for bullshitting.' And we went 'Oh, really?!? Jive talkin', you're telling me lies...' and changed it." Maurice goes on to describe how Arif gave them "the groove, the tempo, everything." Robin Gibb then goes on to mention that, because they were English, they were less self-conscious about going into the "no-go areas", referring to musical styles that were more black in styles, etc. He then said, "We didn't think that there was any 'no go' areas, it's music!" Barry's guitar strumming has a smoother version of Kool and the Gang's signature chicka-chicka and funky Nassau version of KC and the Sunshine Band's Caribbean strumming. The song's rhythm riff perhaps resembles the riff from "Shirley & Company's "Shame, Shame, Shame", with a prominent use of the Bo Diddley beat.

After hearing "Jive Talkin, Lindsey Buckingham of Fleetwood Mac, and co-producer Richard Dashut built up the song "Second Hand News" (released on the band's Rumours in 1977) with four audio tracks of electric guitar and the use of chair percussion to evoke Celtic rock.

Release
Upon its release to radio stations, the single was delivered in a plain white cover, with no immediate indication of what the song's name was or who sang it. The DJs would only find out what the song was and who played it when it was placed on the turntable; RSO did provide the song with a label on the record itself. It was the second time in the band's career that this strategy had been employed to get airplay for their music, after a similar tactic had popularised their debut US single "New York Mining Disaster 1941" in 1967.Record World said that this "delightful departure from [the BeeGees] time-tested sweet sound is no jive at all."

The original studio version was included on the Saturday Night Fever soundtrack, as it was used in a scene that was cut from the final film. Later pressings of the album used the live version of "Jive Talkin'" from the Bee Gees 1977 album, Here at Last... Bee Gees... Live, due to contractual distribution changes. The CD version restores the use of the studio version.

Personnel
Credits adapted from the album Main Course''.
Barry Gibb – vocals, rhythm guitar
Robin Gibb – vocals
Maurice Gibb – rhythm and electric guitars, bass, vocals
Alan Kendall – electric guitars, steel guitar
Blue Weaver – keyboards, synthesizer
Dennis Bryon – drums, percussion

Chart performance

Weekly charts

Year-end charts

All-time charts

Certifications and sales

Boogie Box High version

In 1987, "Jive Talkin'" was covered by Boogie Box High, a musical project of Andros Georgiou's that featured collaborators such as George Michael and Haircut One Hundred's Nick Heyward. Michael sang lead on "Jive Talkin'," although his vocals were uncredited.

Track listings
7″ single
Jive Talkin' – 3:40	
Rhythm Talkin' (Part 1) – 3:50

Weekly charts

Year-end charts

See also
List of Billboard Hot 100 number-one singles of 1975
List of Cash Box Top 100 number-one singles of 1975
List of number-one singles of 1975 (Canada)

References

1975 songs
1975 singles
1987 singles
Bee Gees songs
British funk songs
British disco songs
George Michael songs
Ronnie Dyson songs
Song recordings produced by Arif Mardin
Songs from Saturday Night Fever
Songs written by Barry Gibb
Songs written by Maurice Gibb
Songs written by Robin Gibb
Billboard Hot 100 number-one singles
Cashbox number-one singles
RPM Top Singles number-one singles
RSO Records singles